is a Canadian-Japanese-American action adventure anime television series that acts as a reboot of the 2007–2012 anime show Bakugan Battle Brawlers. The series was produced by TMS Entertainment, Nelvana Enterprises, Man of Action Studios and Spin Master Entertainment under the direction of Kazuya Ichikawa. The story centers on the lives of creatures called Bakugan and the battle brawlers who possess them.

The series first premiered in the United States on Cartoon Network on December 23, 2018, with a number of episodes made available through video-on-demand platforms prior to first broadcast. In Canada, the show debuted on Teletoon on December 31, 2018, and was later rebroadcast on YTV starting January 11, 2019. Bakugan: Battle Planet began airing in Japan on TV Tokyo and other TX Network stations starting April 1, 2019.

A series of animated shorts were released online shortly following the show's television debut.

Episode List
Each of the episodes contains a total of two 11-minute segments.

Bakugan: Battle Planet (2018–20)

Bakugan: Armored Alliance (2020–21)

Bakugan: Geogan Rising (2021)

Bakugan: Evolutions (2022)

Bakugan: Legends (2023)

Episode List

Small Brawl Stories

, originally known as Bakugan: Beyond the Brawl, is a series of animated web-shorts that feature the characters from the show interacting in a more comedic manner. It is streamed on YouTube through a variety of official sources. In English, the series is made available through the Bakugan, Cartoon Network and Teletoon channels, as well as Amazon Prime Video. The shorts are also aired as an interstitial program on some of the linear channels that run the series.

In Japan, the series is streamed on the Japanese-language Bakugan YouTube channel, as well as CoroCoro Comic's. A compilation of the shorts were aired on TV Tokyo and other TX Network stations on July 1, 2019, as an "extra" episode of the Battle Planet television series. A second special ran on October 7, 2019.

Shorts

Compilations

Home releases

English

Japanese

Notes

References

Bakugan Battle Planet
Bakugan episode lists